The 1979–80 Illinois State Redbirds men's basketball team represented Illinois State University during the 1979–80 NCAA Division I men's basketball season. The Redbirds, led by second year head coach Bob Donewald, played their home games at Horton Field House and competed as an independent (not a member of a conference). They finished the season 20–9.

The Redbirds received an invitation to the 1980 National Invitation Tournament. They defeated West Texas State University in the first round and were beaten by the University of Illinois in the second round.

Roster

Schedule

|-
!colspan=9 style=|Exhibition Season

|-
!colspan=9 style=|Regular Season

|-
!colspan=9 style=|National Invitation {NIT} Tournament

References

Illinois State Redbirds men's basketball seasons
Illinois State
Illinois State